Jim Johnson (1929 – 25 February 2021) was an Australian Hall of Fame jockey who is remembered primarily for winning the Melbourne Cup on Gatum Gatum in 1963 and twice on Rain Lover - 1968 & '69.

Career
Johnson is one of the few great jockeys to win the Melbourne Cup three times.

He was also noted for his unusual riding style of virtually standing up.  He also rode in a strange, jerky way. Despite his unorthodox style, Johnson was often supreme in tight finishes, being one of the strongest whip riders of his time.

He won the Adelaide Jockeys Premiership four times, and included wins in the Cox Plate and Caulfield Cup.

He was honoured after his retirement as a jockey with riding a tribute lap aboard the New Zealand thoroughbred Might and Power around the Flemington Racetrack at the beginning of the Melbourne Cup.

He was inducted to the Australian Racing Hall of Fame in August 2009.

Personal life
Johnson lived much of his life in Adelaide South Australia, though after the death of his partner Patricia Delores Mary Prendagast, he returned to Melbourne to be close to his family.

Death
Jim Johnson died on 25 February 2021, aged 92.

References

Australian jockeys
Australian Thoroughbred Racing Hall of Fame inductees
Place of birth missing
1929 births
2021 deaths